Circle of Health International (COHI) is a US based non-governmental organization founded in 2004 with the mission to work with women and their communities with a community based approach in times of crisis. As of 2016, COHI has responded to eighteen humanitarian emergencies and served over three million women globally. COHI has worked with midwives and public health professionals in Sri Lanka, Louisiana, Tibet, Tanzania, Israel, the Philippines, Palestine, Jordan, Syria, Oklahoma, Nicaragua, Sudan, Haiti, and Afghanistan.

As of 2016 COHI supports maternal and child health clinics in Haiti, midwives in an indigenous women's forum in Nicaragua, midwifery students and sexual health advocates in Nepal, a clinic for refugees in the Rio Grande Valley on the Mexico/US border, and works with survivors of human trafficking globally. COHI is also engaged in Austin's social enterprise community through a program, known as the COHI Cloth Network, to address women's poverty through income generation initiatives.

Missions

Tibet 
In 2004, COHI partnered with a local host organization, Tibetan Healing Fund, in Tongren, also known as Repkong, Eastern Tibet to aid with the training of midwives in order to create a more sustainable maternal health care system.

Israel/West Bank 
In 2004, COHI and their partners worked with Israeli and Palestinian woman to address midwifery and gender based violence (GBV). Conducted an assessment based on three main categories

 To produce a substantial GBV ethnography of the region;
 To design and implement specialized programming targeting the cultural nuances of each group; and
 Coalition-building among Israeli and Palestinian organizations to implement relevant projects in partnership with local women's rights organizations.

The assessment included in depth interviews and recommendations for each sector of Israel and the West Bank's diverse populations: religious and secular Jews, immigrant populations (Ethiopian, Russian, Congolese), the Bedouin, and the Palestinian populations of Israel and the West Bank, both Muslim and Christian

The results from the assessment were used to advocate for the needs of Israeli and Palestinian women such as better postpartum care.

References

External links
 Official website

Organizations established in 2004
Women's health
Medical and health organizations based in Texas